Donald R. Berthiaume Jr. is a member of the Massachusetts House of Representatives, sworn in January 2015. A resident of Spencer, Massachusetts, he was elected as a Republican to represent the 5th Worcester district. Berthiaume is a former Spencer selectman.

See also
 2019–2020 Massachusetts legislature
 2021–2022 Massachusetts legislature

References

Republican Party members of the Massachusetts House of Representatives
People from Spencer, Massachusetts
Living people
21st-century American politicians
Year of birth missing (living people)